Syaiful Ramadhan (born 30 April 1989, in Medan) is an Indonesian professional footballer who plays as a full-back for Liga 1 club PSS Sleman.

Club career

PS TNI
Syaiful made his debut against Mitra Kukar in the third week of 2016 Indonesia Soccer Championship A.

PSMS Medan
He was signed for PSMS Medan to play in Liga 2 in the 2019 season. He made 34 league appearances for PSMS Medan.

PSS Sleman
In 2022, Syaiful signed a contract with Indonesian Liga 1 club PSS Sleman. He made his league debut on 18 January 2022 in a match against Madura United at the Kapten I Wayan Dipta Stadium, Gianyar.

References

External links
 
 Syaiful Ramadhan at Liga Indonesia

Living people
1989 births
Indonesian footballers
People from Medan
Sportspeople from North Sumatra
Sportspeople from Medan
PSMS Medan players
PS TIRA players
Mitra Kukar players
PSPS Riau players
Persis Solo players
PSS Sleman players
Liga 2 (Indonesia) players
Liga 1 (Indonesia) players
Association football defenders